The American Automotive Policy Council is an American trade group formed in 2009 by Chrysler, Ford Motor Company and General Motors. The company represents the common public policy interests of its three member companies.

Former Missouri Governor Matt Blunt has served as President of the American Automotive Policy Council since 2011.

See also
 Automobile Manufacturers Association
 Alliance of Automobile Manufacturers
 Association of Global Automakers

External links
 American Automotive Policy Council website

References 

Trade associations based in the United States
2009 establishments in the United States
Organizations established in 2009
Chrysler
Ford Motor Company
General Motors